Rutherford House is a historic building and museum in the Strathcona area of Edmonton, Alberta, Canada. The structure was the home of the first Premier of Alberta, Alexander Cameron Rutherford, from 1911 to 1941, and has subsequently been designated as an Alberta provincial historic site.

Overview
Rutherford House was built by Alexander Cameron Rutherford in 1911 on a large lot in the former City of Strathcona near the University of Alberta campus for $25,000. The residence, initially called Achnacarry by the Rutherford family, after their ancestral castle in Scotland, is now known as Rutherford House Provincial Historic Site. In 1966 the house was designated for demolition as the University of Alberta made plans for expansion. It quickly became a public concern to save the structure. The University Women's Club played a key role in saving this historic resource and in 1970 the Alberta government announced its decision that the house would be preserved. The Rutherford House is operated by Alberta Culture and Community Spirit, Historic Sites and Museums Branch and is assisted by the Friends of Rutherford House, a non-profit, charitable society, formed in 1985 to assist the province with the preservation and presentation of this historic site.

Architecture
The two-storey structure features Elizabethan and Jacobean motifs, with red brick exterior with sandstone trim, tall chimneys, columned porches and two-storey bay windows. The interior of Rutherford House was designed to serve as both a residence and for reception, with eleven foot ceilings, and a grand central hall staircase detailed in oak, with oak paneling and a stained glass skylight. The dining room is the largest room in the house at 350 square feet (32.5m²) featuring a 12 foot wide bay window with fir wainscotting and decorative fir ceiling beams.

History

On 29 May 1909, Alexander Cameron Rutherford became the owner of a superset of the lot now occupied by Rutherford House. The description of him on the certificate title of ownership reads "a gentleman of Strathcona". By late 1909 plans for the house were drawn up by the firm of A.G. Wilson and D.E. Herrald, British-trained architects and civil engineers, and excavation completed by Strathcona contractors James Smith and J.T. Radford. During the following spring of 1910 Thomas Richards, another Strathcona contractor and master bricklayer, prepared the foundation, which was poured by the end of May 1910. The double brick walls were built during the summer of 1910, with some of the work being done by Thomas Richards himself. Work proceeded on the elegant hardwood interior over the winter, with the house being fit for occupancy by February 1911. Rutherford House when completed in 1911 had a number of modern features including hot running water, electric lighting, flush toilets, and telephones.

The Rutherford family of four, including Alexander Cameron Rutherford, Mattie Birkett Rutherford, Cecil Alexander Rutherford and Hazel Elizabeth Rutherford moved in by the end of March 1911. The Rutherfords occupied the house until September 1940, when Mattie Birkett Rutherford died on September 13, 1940. In June 1941, Rutherford House was sold, by Alexander, to the University of Alberta – Delta Upsilon fraternity, for $9500, corresponding to the cost of construction.

The Delta Upsilon fraternity vacated the house in 1969, after expropriation by the University of Alberta in 1968. The Board of Governors of the University of Alberta agreed to lease the house to the Alberta government for forty years in late 1970 following an agreement with Minister of Public Works Albert W. Ludwig, following a successful campaign for preservation as an historic site by the University of Alberta Women's Club, including the assistance of the Women's Canadian Club, the Northern Alberta Pioneers and Old Timers Association, the Historical Society of Alberta, the Edmonton Historical Board, Provincial Museum and the City of Edmonton.

Rutherford House Provincial Historic Site opened to the public in mid 1973, after three years of restoration. Many of the historic artifacts currently in the house are originals, donated by Hazel Elizabeth Rutherford and Helen Reid Rutherford (Cecil Alexander Rutherford's wife).

Friends of Rutherford House Society
The society was created on April 22, 1985, as a registered charitable society. Its mandate is to assist in the preservation and promotion of Rutherford House as an important historical site; by fundraising and providing opportunities for the public to learn about Alberta's cultural, social and political history. Up until recently it ran a tea room called the Arbour Restaurant as well as a small gift shop (currently operated by the museum), and through contractual agreement with the province coordinates all after-hour, private function bookings.

See also
 Achnacarry

Notes

References

External links

University of Alberta Alumni Association
Alberta Heritage – Rutherford House

Historic house museums in Alberta
Museums in Edmonton
Provincial historic sites of Alberta
Museums established in 1970
Fraternity and sorority houses
Houses completed in 1911
Delta Upsilon